The Moshe Dayan Center for Middle Eastern and African Studies is an Israeli think tank based in Tel Aviv, Israel, focused on the contemporary study and analysis of the Middle East and Africa.  Its stated primary mission is to serve as a resource for decision makers and the public at large, both in Israel and internationally, though it differentiates itself from other similar organizations by refraining from recommending specific policies outright.

The Moshe Dayan Center’s team of over thirty researchers comes from a variety of backgrounds and disciplines, and collectively possesses a command of English, Hebrew, Arabic, Turkish, Kurdish, and Persian.  In the wake of the 2011 ‘Arab Spring,’ and the effective collapse of many Middle Eastern states, the center has been active in developing new interpretive frameworks for understanding the region’s complex dynamics.

History 
The idea for the Center was originally proposed by Reuven Shiloah, who was the first director of the Mossad, who wished to create in Israel an organization along the lines of the Chatham House in Great Britain.  Following Shiloah's death, Teddy Kollek, who was then director-general of the Prime Minister's Office (and who later became the Mayor of Jerusalem), suggested that the new institution bear Shiloah's name. In the early days, the Institute operated in close cooperation with the Defense Ministry, the Israeli Foreign Ministry, and the Israel Oriental Society.   It was staffed by a combination of career researchers, often from the defense establishment but with no academic credentials, and doctoral candidates affiliated with the Hebrew University. Initially, it engaged in much classified research. During this time, it developed a "reputation for thoroughness and quasi-academic quality." David Ben-Gurion reportedly turned to the Shiloah Institute in the late 1950s to research and gather material about the Palestinian exodus of 1948;

For a variety of reasons, the Shiloah Institute was not able to thrive independently; one reason was that it suffered from a lack of funding. In 1964, a young researcher by the name of Shimon Shamir wrote to the newly formed Tel Aviv University, and argued that it should absorb the institute, because it "possessed 'a large archive ... and was guaranteed the support and cooperation of the state in the professional sphere, as well as in funding, and in collecting materials to be used in research.'" As part of Tel Aviv University, it became what Prof. Gil Eyal of Columbia University referred to as a "liminal institutional setting between the academy and officialdom," often working closely in tandem with military intelligence officers and "organizing conferences and panel discussions on topical issues of the day, to which they invited military intelligence officers, state officials, journalists, and politicians."

In 1983, the university established the Moshe Dayan Center, which combined the Shiloah Institute and other documentation units dealing with the Middle East.  In its present incarnation, the Moshe Dayan Center no longer has ties with the Israeli intelligence establishment.

Activities 
The Moshe Dayan Center publishes eight analytical publications on a monthly or semi-monthly basis, each dealing with a particular facet of the contemporary Middle East. Additionally, it publishes several books annually under its own imprint, and frequently sponsors symposiums, events, and public lectures. The center maintains its own specialist library housing an extensive collection of journals, articles, archival materials (including the British Archive's Archive Editions), economic source and statistical data, and other reference materials.

The center's Arabic press archives includes more than one thousand reels of microfilmed newspapers, the first of which appeared in 1877, as well as a hard-copy collection containing more than 6,000 newspapers, magazines and periodicals from all over the Middle East.

The center also runs a workshop for university faculty whose work revolves around Israel and the Middle East. The workshop is a ten-day seminar on the geopolitics of Israel and its neighbors, and the history of the region and its significance in contemporary world affairs.

The Reuven Shiloah Institute, and later the Moshe Dayan Center, was notable for its publication of the now-defunct Middle East Contemporary Survey, itself a descendant of the earlier Middle East Record, which was reviewed as "the most comprehensive and authoritative annual review of developments in the Middle East."

Periodical publications 
 Tel Aviv Notes: a bi-monthly analytical update on current affairs and regional developments in the Middle East. It has a regular distribution schedule on the 10th and 26th of each month.
 Middle East Crossroads:  A Hebrew-language analytical publication similar to Tel Aviv Notes.
 Bayan: The Arabs in Israel. A quarterly publication of the Konrad Adenauer Program for Jewish-Arab Cooperation at the Moshe Dayan Center for Middle Eastern and African Studies. The goal of Bayan is to enrich the knowledge of the general public about issues that involve Arab society within Israel. 
 Beehive: Middle East Social Media. A publication of the Doron Halpern Middle East Network Analysis Desk, which studies noteworthy trends on Arab, Turkish, and Iranian social media.
 Bustan: Middle East Book Review. Published through the Penn State University Press, and includes "at least three long-form review essays that review new literature. These essays explore broad themes or issues on a particular topic that go beyond the content of the books under review. The journal also includes ten to fifteen short traditional book reviews, as well as review articles in translation."
Ifriqiya: An analytical publication focusing on sub-Saharan Africa.
Iqtisadi: Middle East Economy. Analyses economic developments in the Middle East and North Africa.  
Turkeyscope: Examines modern Turkish foreign and domestic policy and events.  
Middle East Newsbrief: Released weekly, this summarizes the English-language Arab, Turkish, and Kurdish press, with a particular focus on editorial, versus news pieces.

Governance and partnerships 
The Moshe Dayan Center is governed by an Israeli board of governors, on the advice of an international advisory council. It is administered by an academic director. The center is funded entirely by endowments, research grants, and private and institutional donations.

Some of its programs are in partnership with the Council of Higher Education of the Republic of Turkey and the Konrad Adenauer Foundation.  Its other foreign connections include the Council on Foreign Relations in New York, the Turkish Foreign Policy Institute in Ankara, Royal Institute of International Affairs in London, Emory University, Washington Institute for Near East Policy, and Middle East Technical University (METU) in Ankara.

In 2014, the center began a five-year cooperative program with the George L. Mosse / Laurence A. Weinstein Center for Jewish Studies at the University of Wisconsin-Madison. In August 2015, the center signed a cooperation agreement with the Center for Israel Studies (Jordan).

Selected recent in-house book publications 

 Inbal Tal, "Spreading the Movement’s Message: Women’s Activism in the Islamic Movement in Israel," (2016)
 Itamar Radai, "A Tale of Two Cities: Palestinians in Jerusalem and Jaffa, 1947-1948," (2015)
 Ed. Brandon Friedman and Bruce Maddy-Weitzman, Inglorious Revolutions: State Cohesion in the Middle East after the Arab Spring,  (2015)
 Eds. Uzi Rabi and Shaul Yanai, "The Persian Gulf and the Arabian Peninsula: States and Societies in Transition," (2014)
 Joshua R. Goodman, Contesting Identities in South Sinai: Development, Transformation, and the Articulation of a "Bedouin" Identity under Egyptian Rule, (2014)
 Jason Hillman, "A Storm in a Tea-Cup": The Iraq-Kuwait Crisis of 1961 From Gulf Crisis to Inter-Arab Dispute,  (2014)
 Fouad Ajami, "The Syrian Rebellion," (2013)
 Joseph Kostiner, "The Gulf States: Politics, Society, Economy," (2012)

Notable staff
 Uzi Rabi, Ph.D., current director. His specialisations include the modern history of states and societies in the Persian Gulf, state building in the Middle East, oil and politics in the Middle East, Iranian-Arab relations, and Sunni-Shi’i tensions.
 Itamar Rabinovich, Ph.D. Former Ambassador to the United States. Researcher in the history and politics of Syria and Lebanon.
 Shimon Shamir, Ph.D. Former Ambassador to Egypt and Jordan, and former director of the Reuven Shiloah Institute. 
Irit Back, Ph.D. head of African studies and author of "Intervention and Sovereignty in Africa: Conflict Resolution and International Organisations in Darfur," (2016).
Ofra Bengio, Ph.D. head of Kurdish studies, and editor of "The Kurds: Nation-Building in a Fragmented Homeland," (2014). 
Bruce Maddy-Weitzman, Ph.D. senior research fellow, and a senior fellow at the Foreign Policy Research Institute.  
Asher Susser, Ph.D. senior research fellow, professor emeritus at Tel Aviv University, and a former director of the Moshe Dayan Center.  
Paul Rivlin, Ph.D. senior research fellow, and editor of Iqtisadi: Middle East Economy.   
Mira Tzoreff, Ph.D. research fellow
Esti Webman, Ph.D. senior researcher
Eyal Zisser, Ph.D. Senior Researcher, former director, and currently the Vice-Rector of Tel Aviv University

References

External links 
 The Moshe Dayan Center Official site

Think tanks based in Israel
Tel Aviv University
Organizations established in 1983